The lesser spear-nosed bat (Phyllostomus elongatus) is a bat species found in Bolivia, Brazil, Colombia, Ecuador, Guyana, Peru, Suriname and Venezuela.

References

Phyllostomidae
Bats of South America
Bats of Brazil
Mammals of Colombia
Mammals described in 1810
Taxa named by Étienne Geoffroy Saint-Hilaire